The Chilean ambassador in Washington, D.C. is the official representative of the Government in Santiago de Chile to the Government of the United States.

List of representatives 

|}

References 

 
United States
Chile